The Northern Dimension Partnership in Public Health and Social Well-being (NDPHS) is an international networking platform for strengthening professional connections, sharing and co-creating knowledge, and developing joint activities in public health and social well-being. 
The Partnership is served by the NDPHS Secretariat that was established in 2012 as an international legal entity hosted by the Swedish Government located in Stockholm and funded jointly by the Partner Countries.

History 
The cooperation network arose out of the Northern Dimension Forum on Social Protection and Health held in the city of Joensuu, Finland, in 2002. The NDPHS was formally established at a ministerial-level meeting in Oslo, Norway on 27 October 2003. Today the Partnership constitutes "an umbrella for activities on the regional, subregional and local levels, serving as a forum for coordination and synergies among the various actors."

Objectives 
According to the founding document the main goal of the NDPHS is "to promote sustainable development in the Northern Dimension area through improving human health and social wellbeing." In doing so, reducing the spread of major communicable diseases and preventing life-style related non-communicable diseases as well as enhancing peoples’ levels of social well-being and promoting socially rewarding lifestyles are further tasks of the NDPHS. All in all, as stated in the Oslo Declaration, "[t]he activities (…) should contribute to greater political and administrative coherence in the area, narrowing of social and economic differences, and to a general improvement of the quality of life and of the demographic situation."

Structure 
The highest decision-making body of the NDPHS is the Partnership Annual Conference (PAC), a high-level ministerial dialogue that formulates the overall policy orientation of the Partnership. The operational decision-making body is the Committee of Senior Representatives (CSR) which is composed of senior representatives appointed by each Partner and chaired by a senior representative of the Partnership. The CSR reports to the PAC, ensuring fulfillment of decisions and recommendations of the PAC. 
The chairmanship rotates among the Partners every two years. In 2022-2023 the Partnership is chaired by Sweden and co-chaired by Lithuania. The major practical work e.g. the implementation of the NDPHS Strategy and its accompanying Action Plan, including elaboration and implementation of concrete projects is then done in the Expert Groups, according to their Terms of Reference. The members of the Expert Groups are designated representatives of the Partners who have profound expertise in their respective fields. 

The following expert-level structures are operating within the NDPHS:

Expert Groups
Expert Group on Antimicrobial Resistance (EG AMR)
Expert Group on Alcohol and Substance Use (EG ASA)
Expert Group on HIV, TB, and Associated Infections (EG HIV, TB&AI)
Expert Group on Non-communicable Diseases (EG NCD)
Expert Group on Occupational Safety and Health (EG OSH)
Expert Group on Primary Healthcare (EG PHC)
Expert Group on Prison Health (EG PH)
Task Force on Active and Healthy Ageing

Activities 
The Partnership engages in a number of activities, including policy and expertise exchange, information sharing and dialogue, project development and implementation, information production and dissemination, and advocacy. The Partnership also works toward raising the awareness of the tremendous impact that the health of populations has on the economic prosperity of the countries. Another priority is helping to convey relevant results and recommendations from ongoing and completed projects to the policy level.

The Partnership is the Policy Area Coordinator for "Health" (PA Health) in the European Union Strategy of the Baltic Sea Region (EUSBSR). PA Health focuses on improving and promoting the health - including its social aspects - of people in the Baltic Sea region as an important precondition for ensuring sustainable, prosperous, and healthy societies. By providing a platform for exchange and cooperation across borders and between different sectors, it enables sharing of best practices, identifying common challenges and goals, and developing of joint solutions.

Members 
Partner countries:

Russia (suspended)

Partner organizations:

 European Commission
 Baltic Sea States Subregional Co-operation (BSSSC)
 Barents Euro-Arctic Council (BEAC)
 Council of the Baltic Sea States (CBSS)
 International Labour Organization (ILO)
 International Organisation for Migration (IOM)
 Nordic Council of Ministers (NCM)
 Joint United Nations Programme on HIV/AIDS (UNAIDS)
 World Health Organization (WHO)

References

External links
 www.ndphs.org Official Website
 Northern Dimension of the European Union

Northern Europe
Northern Dimension
Health in Europe